Gary Day may refer to:

 Gary Day (actor) (born 1941), New Zealand Australian actor
 Gary Day (musician) (born 1965), British bass guitarist
 Gary Day (politician), Pennsylvania State Representative for the 187th district
 Gary Day (academic), British academic